The Schnauder is a river of Saxony, Saxony-Anhalt and Thuringia in Germany. It is a right tributary of the White Elster, which it joins near Groitzsch.

See also
List of rivers of Saxony
List of rivers of Saxony-Anhalt
List of rivers of Thuringia

Rivers of Saxony
Rivers of Saxony-Anhalt
Rivers of Thuringia
Rivers of Germany